Montsià is the southernmost comarca (county) of Catalonia in Spain. Its capital and largest city is Amposta.

History
Almost all Montsià municipalities are part of the Taula del Sénia free association or mancomunitat (commonwealth).

Municipalities

See also
Serra del Montsià 
Terres de l'Ebre

References

External links
 
Official comarcal web site (in Catalan)

 
Comarques of the Province of Tarragona